Schönburg is a municipality in the Burgenlandkreis district, in Saxony-Anhalt, Germany. It is situated 5 km east of Naumburg, on the river Saale. It is part of the Verbandsgemeinde ("collective municipality") Wethautal.

The castle was built by the House of Schönburg around 1120 and came into the ownership of the Bishopric of Naumburg-Zeitz during the following century.

References

1803 disestablishments
States and territories established in 1182
Burgenlandkreis